Collingham Football Club is a football club based in Collingham, Nottinghamshire, England.

History
The club was established in 1887. In 1995, a Senior Saturday team was created which joined the Central Midlands League Premier Division.

Having finished 14th in their 1st season promotion to the Supreme Division was clinched the following season by finishing 4th. The following 5 seasons were played out in the Supreme division with a best placed finish of 5th in the 2000/01 season which also included an appearance in the league cup final in which a goal in stoppage time gave Shirebrook Town the trophy in a 1-0 win.

The 2001–02 season saw entry into the FA Vase for the first time in the club's history. The 2nd Qualifying round match vs Meir KA was played at Station Road on 22 September 2001, resulting in a 2-1 win for Collingham. Boston Town were the opposition in the 1st round proper on 20 October, but the cup run come to an end after a 3-2 defeat.

At the end of the 2001–02 season, the team from Collingham was disbanded and it was not until the 2015–16 season that the team returned to this level of football.

References

Football clubs in Nottinghamshire
Central Midlands Football League
Football clubs in England
1887 establishments in England
Association football clubs established in 1887